The 19th Missile Brigade "Saint Barbara" is an artillery formation of the Ukrainian Ground Forces, based in Khmelnytskyi. The brigade is directly subordinated to the Ground Forces Command.

Current Structure 
As of 2017 the brigade's structure is as follows:

 19th Missile Brigade "Saint Barbara", Khmelnytskyi
 Headquarters & Headquarters Battery
 1st Missile Battalion (OTR-21 Tochka-U)
 2nd Missile Battalion (OTR-21 Tochka-U)
 3rd Missile Battalion (OTR-21 Tochka-U)
 4th Missile Battalion (OTR-21 Tochka-U)
 Missile Training Battalion
 7th Motorized Infantry Battalion "Zbruch"
 Engineer Company
 Maintenance Company
 Logistic Company
 CBRN-defense Platoon

The war in Donbas 
According to the interview of the Chief of the General Staff of the Armed Forces of Ukraine Viktor Muzhenko, the Armed Forces of Ukraine quite intensively used the "Point-U" complexes against Russian irregulars and units of the regular Russian army on the territory of Ukraine. The first cases of use of the complex occurred during the battles for Savur-Mohyla in August 2014. During the two years of the war, a total of about one hundred missiles of the "Point-U" complex with various combat units were launched to perform various tasks. 

In August 2014, after the massive introduction of Russian regular troops into the territory of Ukraine, in connection with the inaccessibility of enemy targets for other firepower during the withdrawal of Ukrainian troops from the encirclement near Ilovaisk, the General Staff engaged the 1st RDn of the 19th brigade, as well as 1 ReADn of the 107th ReAP. Long-range artillery supported the outgoing Ukrainian units, creating a "corridor of fire". Strikes were planned along the route of advancing units to target places where the enemy was likely to be located (dominant heights, mounds, road intersections, etc.) from the southern side — for 1 RDn 19 RBr, from the northern side — for 1 ReADn 107 ReAP. Fire was opened on call. In the course of this, about 12 group and single missile strikes were carried out using from 1 to 4 Tochka installations and about 15 fire strikes from the Smerch MLRS using from 1 to 3 combat vehicles.  

According to the assumption of InformNapalm, the T-72BA tank that was destroyed in the base camp of the 21st motorized rifle brigade of the Russian Federation west of the village of Kumachevo during the battles for Ilovaisk, could have been hit by a rocket strike of "Points-U". In October 2014, the militants said that a rocket hit their military base, which was located in the premises of military unit No. 3023 in occupied Donetsk, not far from the airport Prokofiev.  

In August 2016, volunteers of the international Informnapalm community checked information on the use of 9K79-1 "Tochka-U" tactical missile systems and 9K58 "Smerch" multiple rocket launcher systems against units of the Russian Armed Forces in the summer of 2014 and found certain coincidences between the known losses of the Russian military and possible launches of "Point-U" missiles.

References

Artillery brigades of Ukraine
Brigades of the Ukrainian Ground Forces
Ballistic missile units and formations
Military units and formations of the 2022 Russian invasion of Ukraine
Military units and formations of the Russo-Ukrainian War